Great Shoals Light was a screw-pile lighthouse in the Chesapeake Bay at the mouth of the Wicomico River.

History
This light was constructed to mark a narrow channel at the entrance to the Wicomico River, as requested by the Maryland General Assembly in 1882. An appropriation was not made until the following year, and further delays pushed the commissioning date to August 1884.

In 1966 the light was dismantled and a modern automated light was erected on the old foundation.

References

Great Shoals Lighthouse, from the Chesapeake Chapter of the United States Lighthouse Society

External links

Lighthouses completed in 1884
Houses completed in 1884
Lighthouses in the Chesapeake Bay
Lighthouses in Somerset County, Maryland